The Global Innovation Index is an annual ranking of countries by their capacity for, and success in, innovation, published by the World Intellectual Property Organization. It was started in 2007 by INSEAD and World Business, a British magazine. Until 2021 it was published by the World Intellectual Property Organization, in partnership with Cornell University, INSEAD, and other organisations and institutions. It is based on both subjective and objective data derived from several sources, including the International Telecommunication Union, the World Bank and the World Economic Forum.

History 
The index was started in 2007 by INSEAD and World Business, a British magazine. It was created by Soumitra Dutta.

Methodology 
The index is computed by taking a simple average of the scores in two sub-indices, the Innovation Input Index and Innovation Output Index, which are composed of five and two pillars respectively. Each of these pillars describe an attribute of innovation, and comprise up to five indicators, and their score is calculated by the weighted average method.

Since its inception in 2007, an increasing number of governments systematically analyze their annual GII results and design policy responses to improve their performance. The index is mentioned in a resolution on science, technology and innovation for sustainable development adopted on 19 December 2019 by the General Assembly of the United Nations.

The index has been criticized for giving excessive significance attributed to factors that aren’t integral to innovation. For instance, “Ease of Paying Taxes“, “Electricity Output“ (half-weightage) and “Ease of Protecting Minority Investors” are factors alongside “Ease of Getting Credit” and “Venture Capital Deals“.

Themes 
Every two years the GII covers a theme related to innovation which goes beyond the innovation rankings. In 2020, the theme was “Who will finance innovation?” shedding light on the state of innovation financing by investigating the evolution of existing mechanisms and pointing to progress and remaining challenges. Previous GII themes covered health innovation, environmental innovation, agricultural and food innovation, and others.

Ranking 

The top 50 ranking for 2022:

See also 
 International Innovation Index

References

Further reading 

 Global innovation rankings: The innovation game. The Economist. September 17, 2015.

Research
International rankings
Innovation